Alfred Ritscher (23 May 1879 in Bad Lauterberg – 30 March 1963 in Hamburg) was a German polar explorer. A Kapitän zur See in the Kriegsmarine, he led the third  German Antarctic Expedition in 1938–39, which mapped the New Swabia territories of Queen Maud Land. Ritscher Peak and Ritscher Upland there are named for him.

Biography 
In 1897 Alfred Ritscher made his first trip as a cabin boy on the Bremen ship "Emily". In 1903 he passed his helmsman exams and earned his master's certificate in 1907. At the beginning of 1912, Ritscher gained a place in the newly created Seehandbuchwerk of the Navy Office.

Ritscher was skipper of the "German Arctic Expedition" of 1912–1913, under the command of Herbert Schröder-Stranz, which departed from Tromsø in the motor vessel Herzog Ernst for a preliminary reconnaissance  of a planned navigation of the Northeast Passage. He also took over the leadership of the airborne survey of the expedition and obtained a pilot licence. The expedition failed whilst attempting the crossing of the Nordaustlandet island in northeastern Spitsbergen archipelago, because of poor equipment, misjudged weather, and starting too late in the year. Search expeditions were sent after his message about the fate of the Schroeder-Stranz expedition and saved six of the fourteen missing expedition members.

During the First World War, Ritscher made reconnaissance flights in support of Marine units in Flanders. After the war he worked as an independent businessman and in 1925 worked as a specialist in aerial navigation with Lufthansa.

In 1934, Ritscher divorced his Jewish wife Susan née Loewenthal, in order not to endanger his career in the War Department.

Also in 1934, Ritscher became an officer in command of the Navy. In 1938, he became head of the German Antarctic Expedition 1938/39, with a mandate to set up a base for the German whaling fleet, carry out air exploration and claim territory. Around 11,000 aerial photographs were taken.

At the outbreak of the Second World War, Ritscher was preparing another expedition with improved ski-planes, which was cancelled. After the Second World War Ritscher continued as chairman of the "Association for the promotion of the Archive for Polar Research Inc.," which was renamed in 1959 to the West German Society of Polar Research Association.

Awards 
 1959: Grand Federal Cross of Merit
 1959: Silver Kirchenpauer Medal of the Geographical Society in Hamburg
 The Ritschergipfel and the Ritscher Highlands in East Antarctica have been named after him.

Works 
 Preliminary Report on the German Antarctic Expedition 1938/39. - Ann. Hydrog. and Marit. Meteorol. 67, August-booklet. Inside: Overview table of the work area of the German Antarctic Expedition 1938-39: Neuschwabenland: 1:1.500.000 - 1 May / June 1939.
 German Antarctic Expedition 1938/39 with the base plane of Lufthansa AG M.S. "Swabia". - 1 Band, Scientific and flying experiences, Koehler & Amelang; Leipzig 1942nd
 German Antarctic Expedition 1938/39 with the base plane of Lufthansa AG M.S. "Swabia". - 2 Band, Scientific Results. Geographical and Cartographic Institute "Mundus", Hamburg, 1954–58.

See also
 New Swabia
 List of Antarctic expeditions
 List of polar explorers

References

External links
 United States Geological Survey, Geographic Names Information System (GNIS)

1879 births
1963 deaths
People from Bad Lauterberg
People from the Province of Hanover
German explorers
Explorers of Antarctica
History of Antarctica
Research and development in Nazi Germany
Germany and the Antarctic
Imperial German Navy personnel of World War I
Luftstreitkräfte personnel
Commanders Crosses of the Order of Merit of the Federal Republic of Germany
Lufthansa people